In enzymology, a thiol sulfotransferase is an enzyme that catalyzes the chemical reaction

3'-phosphoadenylyl sulfate + a thiol  adenosine 3',5'-bisphosphate + an S-alkyl thiosulfate

Thus, the two substrates of this enzyme are 3'-phosphoadenylyl sulfate and thiol, whereas its two products are adenosine 3',5'-bisphosphate and S-alkyl thiosulfate.

This enzyme belongs to the family of transferases, specifically the sulfotransferases, which transfer sulfur-containing groups.  The systematic name of this enzyme class is 3'-phosphoadenylyl-sulfate:thiol S-sulfotransferase. Other names in common use include phosphoadenylylsulfate-thiol sulfotransferase, PAPS sulfotransferase, and adenosine 3'-phosphate 5'-sulphatophosphate sulfotransferase.

References 

 
 
 

EC 2.8.2
Enzymes of unknown structure